The Marylake Carmelite Monastery is a monastery for men seeking to become members of the Discalced Carmelites, a Catholic mendicant order.

History

The area was first the Shrine Country Club of Little Rock, built in 1926. After the failure of the country club, the infamous Dr. John R. Brinkley set up shop in what he declared was "The World's Most Beautiful Hospital."

On December 22, 1951, the wife of L. G. LeTorneau agreed to sell what was then known as "Pine Lake Camp" to the Carmelite Friars. Br. Victor Kopycinski then moved to the building to prepare it for the arrival of a community of friars.  Friar Felix DaPrato was elected Prior and offered the first Mass there on May 4, 1952.  The chapel was dedicated on July 25 of the same year by Bishop Albert Fletcher, and after an "open house" of three days, he blessed the monastery and imposed the cloister on Sunday, July 27, 1952.  The Marylake Cemetery was dedicated on October 26, 1966.

Today it is still used as a monastery for the Carmelite Brothers.  Men wanting to become members undergo a year of intense prayer and training of Carmelite life at the monastery.

Location
The monastery is located 15 miles south of Little Rock, Arkansas at 5151 Marylake Drive.

References

Roman Catholic Diocese of Little Rock
Buildings and structures in Little Rock, Arkansas
Carmelite monasteries in the United States
Religious buildings and structures in Arkansas
Catholic Church in Arkansas
Discalced Carmelite Order